Maja Kezele (born 31 July 1979) is a Croatian cross-country skier. She competed at the 2002 Winter Olympics and the 2006 Winter Olympics.

References

External links
 

1979 births
Living people
Croatian female cross-country skiers
Olympic cross-country skiers of Croatia
Cross-country skiers at the 2002 Winter Olympics
Cross-country skiers at the 2006 Winter Olympics
Sportspeople from Rijeka